Two Old Friends is the fifty-second studio album by Merle Haggard and Albert E. Brumley, Jr, son of gospel legend and songwriter Albert E. Brumley. It was released in 1999.

Reception
AllMusic's review stated "Backed by Haggard's crack touring band, the pair work their way through compositions... with the immediacy and warmth of a back-porch jam session."

Track listing
"There's a Road Down the Road" (Albert E. Brumley, Jr., Dale Vest) – 2:13
"Victory in Jesus" (Eugene Bartlett) – 2:33
"The Old Drover's Prayer" (Brumley, Jr.) – 2:17
"If You See a Change in Me" (Merle Haggard) – 3:15
"I Dreamed I Met Mother and Daddy" (Brumley, Jr., Kay Hively) – 3:12
"I'll Fly Away" (Albert E. Brumley) – 3:04
"Old Rugged Shoes" (Haggard) – 3:21
"Marching Over Jordan" (Brumley, Jr., Hively) – 2:49
"Someday He'll Whisper My Name" (Haggard) – 4:03
"Everybody Knows" (Brumley, Jr., Hively) – 2:37
"I'll Meet You in the Morning" (Brumley) – 3:19

Personnel
Merle Haggard – vocals, guitar, fiddle
Norm Hamlet – dobro, pedal steel guitar
Don Markham – trumpet
Bonnie Owens – harmony vocals
Albert Brumley, Jr. – vocals
Doug Colosio – keyboards, piano
Eddie Curtis – bass
Abe Manuel, Jr. – accordion, fiddle, guitar
Randy Mason – drums
Redd Volkaert – guitar

References

2001 albums
Merle Haggard albums
Gospel albums by American artists